Cappadocia is a historical region of Asia Minor, in modern Turkey.

Cappadocia can also refer to:
 Gregory of Cappadocia, installed as Patriarch of Alexandria against Saint Athanasius
 Cappadocia (satrapy), a province of the Achaemenid Empire, covering the region
 Cappadocia (Roman province), a province of the Roman Empire, covering the region
 Cappadocia (theme), a Byzantine province
 Cappadocia, Abruzzo, a comune in Italy
 Cappadocia (TV series), a Mexican television series

See also
 Cappadocian (disambiguation)